Elgin (also known as Elgin—Norfolk) was a federal electoral district represented in the House of Commons of Canada from 1935 to 1997. It was located in the province of Ontario. This riding was created in 1933 from parts of Elgin West and Norfolk—Elgin ridings.

It initially consisted of the county of Elgin, including the city of St. Thomas. In 1966, it was redefined to consist of the County of Elgin and the Village of Belmont in the County of Middlesex. In 1987, it was redefined to consist of the County of Elgin and the Township of Norfolk in the Regional Municipality of Haldimand-Norfolk.

The name of electoral district was changed in 1990 to Elgin—Norfolk.

The electoral district was abolished in 1996 when it was redistributed between Elgin—Middlesex—London and Haldimand—Norfolk—Brant ridings.

Members of Parliament

This riding has elected the following Members of Parliament:

Election results

Elgin

|}

|}

|}

|}

|}

On Mr. Coyle's death, 19 January 1954:

|}

|}

|}

|}

|}

|}

|}

|}

|}

|}

|}

|}

|}

Elgin—Norfolk

|}

See also 

 List of Canadian federal electoral districts
 Past Canadian electoral districts

External links 
Riding history of Elgin from the Library of Parliament
Riding history of Elgin-Norfolk from the Library of Parliament

Former federal electoral districts of Ontario